The Rich Earth Institute is an organization which is focused on turning human urine into fertilizer. It is headquartered in Brattleboro, Vermont. The institute processes about twelve thousand gallons of urine per year.

See also
Ecological sanitation
Reuse of human excreta
Urine-diverting dry toilet

References

External links
 Official website

Agriculture in Vermont